The Political Parties and Elections Act 2009 (c 12) is an Act of the Parliament of the United Kingdom. It implemented the proposals contained in the Government White Paper on "Party Finance and Expenditure in the United Kingdom" published on 16 June 2008.

References
Halsbury's Statutes,

External links
The Political Parties and Elections Act 2009, as amended from the National Archives.
The Political Parties and Elections Act 2009, as originally enacted from the National Archives.
Explanatory notes to the Political Parties and Elections Act 2009.

United Kingdom Acts of Parliament 2009
Election law in the United Kingdom
Electoral reform in the United Kingdom